University of Wisconsin–Platteville (UW–Platteville or UW Platt) is a public university in Platteville, Wisconsin. Part of the University of Wisconsin System, it offers bachelor's and master's degrees. The university has three colleges that serve over 8,000 students on-campus and an additional 3,000 students through its five distance education programs.

History
The university grew from the 1959 merger of two schools: Wisconsin State College, Platteville, and Wisconsin Institute of Technology. WSC-Platteville was founded in 1866 as Platteville Normal School, the first teacher preparation school in Wisconsin. It was renamed Platteville State Teachers College in 1926 and Wisconsin State College, Platteville in 1951. The Wisconsin Institute of Technology, founded in 1907 as the Wisconsin Mining Trade School, was founded to train technicians for the numerous mining operations around Platteville.  It evolved into the first three-year program for mining engineers in the United States. It changed its name to the Wisconsin Institute of Technology in 1939.  The merged school took the name Wisconsin State College and Institute of Technology. In 1966, along with Wisconsin's other state colleges, it was granted university status as Wisconsin State University-Platteville. It took its current name after the Wisconsin State University system merged with the University of Wisconsin in 1971.

Starting in the late 1960s, the University of Wisconsin–Platteville expanded its academic program and established new colleges, the largest being a business college. The mining college was transformed into an engineering college encompassing mining, electrical, mechanical, and eventually electronic engineering. In the late 1980s, the mining engineering degree was phased out because of falling enrollment. By that time it had been overshadowed by the other engineering degrees.

From 1984 to 2000, the Chicago Bears of the National Football League held pre-season training camp at UW–Platteville. They were considered a member of the "Cheese League" that in 1999 consisted of the Green Bay Packers, New Orleans Saints and Kansas City Chiefs, with each team practicing at a different university in Wisconsin. In 2001, the Illinois General Assembly asked the Bears to move to an Illinois practice facility in order to raise funds for remodeling Soldier Field. Before the Bears left, they donated $250,000 to UW–Platteville for a new computer lab, which was named "The Bears Den".

In the 1980s, UW-Platteville made an effort to bring businesses to the Platteville area to take advantage of university resources. Rockwell Automation started this trend in the 1980s when it recruited two engineering professors at UW–Platteville to start an engineering firm.  Rockwell provided financing and awarded them major contracts. The resulting business was Insight Industries, which later changed to AVISTA Inc. (now a division of Esterline, Inc.).

On June 16, 2014, an EF2 tornado struck the UW-Platteville campus, causing $18.6 million in damage.

The Agriculture and Manual Arts Building/Platteville State Normal School, now known as Ullrich Hall, is listed on the National Register of Historic Places.

In 2018, the University of Wisconsin System restructured through the Collaborative Integration Project, which bound the University of Wisconsin Colleges to the Universities.  The University of Wisconsin-Richland and The University of Wisconsin-Baraboo/Sauk County were joined with Platteville as branch campuses, and renamed the University of Wisconsin–Platteville Richland and the University of Wisconsin–Platteville Baraboo/Sauk County respectively.

Campus
UW–Platteville's campus has no city streets that cut through campus. During the 1960s, all city streets and parking lots within the campus were replaced with wide sidewalks and manicured lawns.

UW–Platteville has 13 residence halls. Southwest Hall opened in the fall of 2006. To accommodate a rapidly growing student body, Rountree Commons opened in August 2012 and Bridgeway Commons opened in August 2013.

Ullsvik Hall, renovated and expanded between 2006 and 2008, houses administrative offices, academic facilities, visitor center, and other support departments.  It also has banquet and catering facilities, including the Robert I. Velzy Commons, and the Nohr Art Gallery.

Student union
In 2002, a new student union, the Markee Pioneer Student Center, was opened at the center of campus. The new location makes the student union the heart of the campus.  The union also serves as a technology and activity hub with a large computer lab (the Bear's Den), an involvement center, and on-campus activities. The union houses three of eight dining complexes, the Pioneer Crossing, Pioneer Haus, and The Pioneer Perk. The other location for food on campus is Bridgeway Commons, located in the residence hall section of campus. In 2011 the student center building was named the Markee Pioneer Student Center, after former Chancellor David Markee and his wife Lou Ann.

Organization
The university is part of the University of Wisconsin System, and has an administrative staff headed by a Chancellor.  Its colleges are headed by deans and departments chairpersons who report to the deans.
The university consists of three colleges that offer bachelor's and master's degrees:
 The College of Business, Industry, Life Sciences and Agriculture – offering programs in modern business and industrial applications, biology and agricultural sciences.
 The College of Liberal Arts and Education – with programs in humanities, social sciences (such as psychology), fine arts and education
 The College of Engineering, Mathematics and Science – consisting of electrical, mechanical, industrial, civil/environmental, computer science, software engineering, chemistry, engineering physics, and mathematics.

Students and faculty
In 2004, UWP received approval from the UW system to increase its enrollment from 5,500 to 7,500 students. UWP started a program called the Tri-State Initiative, which aims to attract prospective students from Illinois and Iowa. The enrollment of UWP, as of Spring 2008, stood at 7,795 undergraduates and 830 graduate students. As of 2004, UWP was staffed by 336 faculty.

Distance education
In 1978, the University introduced print-based courses to enable Wisconsin residents living in isolated areas to earn an undergraduate degree in business administration without having to travel to a university campus.  In 1996, the residency requirement was amended and the distance program was extended to working adults living throughout the United States. In 1999, online graduate programs in criminal justice, engineering, and project management were introduced, allowing students throughout the world to earn an accredited degree at a distance from UW–P. In addition to accredited degree programs, UWP has also developed online leadership and management courses in association with the Wisconsin Department of Justice and on-site project management courses in association with a project management consulting company.

Extracurricular activities
UW–Platteville has over 250 clubs and organizations including American Foundry Society.

Athletics
UW–Platteville is a member of the Wisconsin Intercollegiate Athletic Conference in 14 sports, including football and basketball. The teams are nicknamed the Pioneers. Men's sports include basketball, football, indoor & outdoor track and field, cross country, wrestling, soccer, and baseball. Women's sports include basketball, soccer, indoor & outdoor track and field, volleyball, cross country, golf, softball, and cheerleading. All teams compete in NCAA Division III and Wisconsin Intercollegiate Athletic Conference. There are also a number of club sports teams such as hockey and lacrosse which are partially funded through the university.

The men's basketball team won NCAA Division III championships in 1991, 1995, 1998, and 1999. The Pioneers qualified for the Division III men's basketball tournament from 1991-1999 and returned 10 years later in 2009. Bo Ryan, who later became head coach of the Wisconsin Badgers, guided the Pioneers to a 353-76 record and the best winning percentage in NCAA Division III basketball. Ryan established one of the best home court advantages of all time as the Pioneers only lost 5 games at home in a decade. The team averaged 26 wins a season in the 1990s, when the Division III men's regular season schedule only allowed 25 games per year. The university named the basketball floor "Bo Ryan Court" in January, 2007.
Ralph E. Davis Pioneer Stadium is home to the football team, lacrosse team, and soccer team.
Williams Fieldhouse is home to the men's and women's basketball teams.

Media
The student newspaper, The Exponent, is published weekly by a student staff. The student radio station, WSUP, is the oldest radio station in the UW system.

Greek life
UW–Platteville has several nationally affiliated and local Greek organizations:

Fraternities
Alpha Gamma Rho
Delta Sigma Phi
Delta Psi Chi
FarmHouse
Phi Mu Alpha Sinfonia
Phi Sigma – local chapter (Philadelphian Society)
Sigma Phi Epsilon
Sigma Pi
Sigma Tau Gamma
Tau Kappa Epsilon

Sororities
Ceres (female fraternity)
Gamma Phi Beta
Kappa Alpha Sigma- local chapter
Sigma Alpha
Sigma Alpha Iota (Women's Professional Music Fraternity)
Theta Phi Alpha
Zeta Beta Chi – No longer a part of campus Greek Life  (local chapter, not associated with Dartmouth ZBX organization)

Traditions

The largest celebration by UW–Platteville students is the twice-annual lighting of the Platte Mound M. The "M" is located on Platte Mound, a nearby large hill east of the city of Platteville.

Each Spring, the men's and women's rugby clubs host Mudfest on campus, a large fifteen-style rugby tournament for teams around the Midwest.

Culture
Of the student body over 3,700 live in campus residence halls, with a growing number of students staying in town during the weekends. Students who don't live on campus typically live in houses off-campus which are rented by the year. The local music scene, funded by area taverns has been active, producing several bands a year. The band All Envy Aside (formerly Envy) won the MTV Best Band on Campus contest in 2005.

Gallery

Notable people
The following have attended or held positions at University of Wisconsin–Platteville:

Athletics
Dan Arnold – football player for the Jacksonville Jaguars
Geep Chryst – football coach (1987); former San Francisco 49ers quarterbacks coach
Rob Jeter – basketball player (1987–1991) and coach (1994–1998); former University of Wisconsin–Milwaukee's men's basketball coach
Saul Phillips – basketball player (1991–1995); now men's basketball coach at Northern State
Chester J. Roberts – football coach (1917); was previously head coach of the Miami Redskins football and men's basketball teams
Bo Ryan – men's basketball coach (1984–1999); former men's basketball coach at the University of Wisconsin–Madison

Alumni
James N. Azim, Jr. – Wisconsin State Representative
Taylor G. Brown – Wisconsin State Senator
James R. Charneski – Wisconsin State Representative
Lee Croft – NFL player
Glenn Robert Davis – U.S. Representative
Tom Davis – former basketball coach for Lafayette College, Boston College, Stanford University, the University of Iowa, and Drake University.
George Engebretson – Wisconsin State Senator
Charles E. Estabrook – Wisconsin Attorney General
Greg Gard – Head men's basketball coach for the Wisconsin Badgers
Gary J. Goldberg – President and Chief Executive Officer, Newmont Mining Corporation
William H. Goldthorpe – Wisconsin State Representative
Mike Hintz – NFL player
William A. Jones – Wisconsin State Representative
Arthur W. Kopp – Wisconsin politician and jurist
Dennis R. Larsen – U.S. Air Force Lieutenant General
James B. McCoy – Wisconsin State Representative
Phil Micech – NFL player
James William Murphy – U.S. Representative
David Ott – classical music composer
John F. Reynolds – Wisconsin State Representative and Senator
Elmer Lloyd Rundell – Wisconsin State Representative
Edward H. Sprague – Wisconsin State Representative
Barbara Thompson – Wisconsin Superintendent of Public Instruction
Jerome Van Sistine – Wisconsin State Senator
A. V. Wells – Wisconsin State Representative
T. Harry Williams – historian
James Wright – historian and president of Dartmouth College.

Faculty
Duncan McGregor – Wisconsin State Representative
Kathryn Morrison – Wisconsin State Senator

See also 
WSUP-FM – student radio station (90.5 MHz)

References

External links

 
 UW–Platteville athletics website

 
University of Wisconsin-Platteville
Platteville
University of Wisconsin-Platteville
Educational institutions established in 1866
Buildings and structures in Grant County, Wisconsin
Tourist attractions in Grant County, Wisconsin
1866 establishments in Wisconsin
Engineering universities and colleges in Wisconsin